Yeo Sang-kyoo (Korean: 여상규, born 15 September 1948) is a South Korean judge, lawyer and politician. He is the incumbent Member of National Assembly for Sacheon-Namhae-Hadong, as well as the Chairman of the Legislation and Judiciary Committee.

Early life and career 
Born in Hadong, Yeo was educated at Akyang Primary School, Akyang Secondary School, and Kyungnam High School. He earned a bachelor's degree in law from Seoul National University. After the graduation, he passed the judicial examination in 1978, and was appointed as a judge of the Seoul Central District Court in 1980. In 1990, he switched to the Seoul High Court and worked there for 3 years.

Yeo is also the incumbent director of the Bang Il-young Cultural Foundation since 1993.

Political career 
After working at several organisations, Yeo was brought to the Grand National Party (GNP), prior to the 2008 election. He was selected as an MP candidate for Namhae-Hadong, replacing the incumbent Park Hui-tae. He defeated Kim Doo-kwan (Independent) and Kim Yoon-gon (FPPU).

In 2012 election, Yeo ran for newly-created Sacheon-Namhae-Hadong constituency, and won the election. Few months after the re-election in 2016, he left Saenuri Party (Liberty Korea Party since February 2017) and joined Bareun Party. However, he returned to Liberty Korea Party on 2 May 2017 and endorsed Hong Joon-pyo for the upcoming presidential election.

Controversies 
On 27 January 2018, Unanswered Questions of SBS reported that Suk Dal-yoon was convicted of letting spy in 1981, where Yeo was the judge in charge. In the programme, Suk's son, Suk Kwon-ho, explained that his father was tortured by the Korean Central Intelligence Agency, such as putting a ballpoint pen refill into his penis. Following are the telephone conversation between Yeo and the programme emcee.

Following his reaction, several Democratic MPs including Sohn Hye-won, Jin Sun-mee and Jung Chung-rae condemned him. Jin called his reaction as "disgusting", whereas Jung criticised him as "disrespectful". Kwon Sung-joo, the spokesperson of the Bareun Party, urged him to apologise.

Election results

General elections

References

External links 
 Yeo Sang-kyoo on Blog
 Yeo Sang-kyoo on Facebook
 Yeo Sang-kyoo on Twitter

1948 births
Living people
South Korean politicians
South Korean judges